The Cuban many-ringed amphisbaena (Amphisbaena barbouri), also known commonly as the Cuban many-ringed worm lizard, is a species of amphisbaenian in the family Amphisbaenidae. The species is endemic to Cuba.

Etymology
The specific name, barbouri, is in honor of American herpetologist Thomas Barbour.

Habitat
The preferred habitat of A. barbouri is forest.

Reproduction
A. barbouri is oviparous.

References

Further reading
Gans C (2005). "Checklist and Bibliography of the Amphisbaenia of the World". Bulletin of the American Museum of Natural History (289): 1–130. (Amphisbaena barbouri, p. 11). 
Gans C, Alexander AA (1962). "Studies on amphisbaenids (Amphisbaenia, Reptilia). 2. On the amphisbaenids of the Antilles". Bulletin of the Museum of Comparative Zoology at Harvard College 128 (3): 65-158 + Plates 1–12. (Amphisbaena cubana barbouri, new subspecies, pp. 100–101).
Schwartz A, Thomas R (1975). A Check-list of West Indian Amphibians and Reptiles. Carnegie Museum of Natural History Special Publication No. 1. Pittsburgh, Pennsylvania: Carnegie Museum of Natural History. 216 pp. (Amphisbaena cubana barbouri, p. 167).
Thomas R, Hedges SB (1998). "A New Amphisbaenian from Cuba". Journal of Herpetology 32 (1): 92–96. (Amphisbaena barbouri, new status).

Amphisbaena (lizard)
Reptiles described in 1962
Taxa named by Carl Gans
Endemic fauna of Cuba
Reptiles of Cuba